The NYC Pride March is an annual event celebrating the LGBTQ community  in New York City. Among the largest Pride events in the world, the NYC Pride March attracts tens of thousands of participants and millions of sidewalk spectators each June.  The route of the Pride parade through Lower Manhattan traverses south on Fifth Avenue, through Greenwich Village, passing the Stonewall National Monument, site of the June 1969 riots that launched the modern movement for LGBTQ+ rights. It is also the largest Pride parade in the United States.

The March is a central component of NYC Pride, together with the Rally, PrideFest, and Pride Island events. One LGBT travel guide claims the "fabulosity of Gay New York is unrivaled" and "queer culture seeps into every corner of its five boroughs." To date the largest NYC Pride March coincided with Stonewall 50 – WorldPride NYC 2019, commemorating the 50th anniversary of the riots at the Stonewall Inn, with 150,000 participants and five million visitors to Manhattan on Pride weekend; an estimated four million attended the parade.  The most recent parade occurred on June 26, 2022.

Origins

Early on the morning of Saturday, June 28, 1969, lesbian, gay, bisexual, and transgender (LGBT) people rioted, following a police raid on the Stonewall Inn, a gay bar at 53 Christopher Street in Greenwich Village, Lower Manhattan. This event, together with further protests and rioting over the following nights, marked a watershed moment in the modern LGBT rights movement and the impetus for organizing LGBT pride marches on a much larger scale. Veterans of the riot formed a group, the Stonewall Veterans Association, which has continued to drive the advancement of LGBT rights from the rioting at the Stonewall Inn, to the present day.  

In the weeks following the riots, 500 people gathered for a "Gay Power" demonstration in Washington Square Park, followed by a march to Sheridan Square within the West Village.

On November 2, 1969, Craig Rodwell, his partner Fred Sargeant, Ellen Broidy, and Linda Rhodes proposed an annual march to be held in New York City by way of a resolution at the Eastern Regional Conference of Homophile Organizations (ERCHO) meeting in Philadelphia.
We propose that a demonstration be held annually on the last Saturday in June in New York City to commemorate the 1969 spontaneous demonstrations on Christopher Street and this demonstration be called CHRISTOPHER STREET LIBERATION DAY. No dress or age regulations shall be made for this demonstration.

We also propose that we contact Homophile organizations throughout the country and suggest that they hold parallel demonstrations on that day. We propose a nationwide show of support.Marotta, pp. 164–165Duberman, pp. 255, 262, 270–280

All attendees to the ERCHO meeting in Philadelphia voted for the march except for Mattachine Society of New York, which abstained. Members of the Gay Liberation Front (GLF) attended the meeting and were seated as guests of Rodwell's group, Homophile Youth Movement in Neighborhoods (HYMN).

Meetings to organize the march began in early January at Rodwell's apartment in 350 Bleecker Street. At first there was difficulty getting some of the major New York City organizations like Gay Activists Alliance (GAA) to send representatives. Craig Rodwell and his partner Fred Sargeant, Ellen Broidy, Michael Brown, Marty Nixon, and Foster Gunnison Jr. of Mattachine made up the core group of the CSLD Umbrella Committee (CSLDUC). For initial funding, Gunnison served as treasurer and sought donations from the national homophile organizations and sponsors, while Sargeant solicited donations via the Oscar Wilde Memorial Bookshop customer mailing list and Nixon worked to gain financial support from GLF in his position as treasurer for that organization. Other mainstays of the organizing committee were Judy Miller, Jack Waluska, Steve Gerrie and Brenda Howard of GLF. Believing that more people would turn out for the march on a Sunday, and so as to mark the date of the start of the Stonewall uprising, the committee scheduled the date for the first march for Sunday, June 28, 1970. With Dick Leitsch's replacement as president of Mattachine NY by Michael Kotis in April 1970, opposition to the march by Mattachine ended.

Christopher Street Liberation Day on June 28, 1970 marked the first anniversary of the Stonewall riots with a march from Sheridan Square, covering the 51 blocks to the Sheep Meadow in Central Park. The march took less than half the scheduled time due to excitement, but also due to wariness about walking through the city with gay banners and signs. Although the parade permit was delivered only two hours before the start of the march, participants encountered little resistance from onlookers. The New York Times reported (on the front page) that the march extended for about 15 city blocks. Reporting by The Village Voice was positive, describing "the out-front resistance that grew out of the police raid on the Stonewall Inn one year ago". There was also an assembly on Christopher Street.

Organizers

The first March in 1970 was organized by the Christopher Street Liberation Day Committee.  Since 1984, the parade and related LGBT pride events in New York City have been produced and organized by Heritage of Pride (HOP), a  volunteer spearheaded, non-partisan, tax-exempt, non-profit organization. HOP welcomes participation regardless of age, creed, gender, gender identification, HIV status, national origin, physical, mental or developmental ability, race, or religion. HOP does not use qualifiers for participation.

In 2021, NYC Pride organizers announced that uniformed law enforcement would be banned from marching in the parade until 2025, when the ban will be reexamined by committees and the executive board of NYC Pride.

Broadcast
For many years the march was only available locally to Time Warner Cable customers, via its NY1 news channel. In 2017 WABC-TV broadcast the NYC LGBT Pride March live for the first time regionally, and made the stream available to all parts of the globe where such content is accessible. WABC-TV continues to broadcast the first three hours of each years march (which has had an actual run time over nine hours in 2017 and 2018). Both the 2017 and 2018 broadcasts were Emmy nominated programs. In 2022, the WABC-TV broadcast was also available via streaming from ABC News Live and Hulu.

Schisms

Over the course of five decades, various groups have accused the NYC Pride March of losing its political, activist roots and becoming a venue for corporate pinkwashing, rainbow capitalism, and assimilation of queer identities. Such critiques have given rise to various independent events conducted without permits or police. Since 1993 the NYC Dyke March has been held annually on the Saturday prior.  Since 1994 the New York City Drag March has been held annually on the Friday prior; it began as a protest against the ban on leather and drag during the 25th anniversary of Stonewall. Coinciding with the 50th anniversary of Stonewall in 2019, the Reclaim Pride Coalition organized the first Queer Liberation March, held on Sunday morning, hours before the NYC Pride parade.

Size 
The first march, in 1970, was front-page news in The New York Times reporting the march extended for about fifteen city blocks. The march had thousands of participants with organizers "who said variously 3,000 and 5,000 and even 20,000." The variance could be due, in part, that although the march started with over a dozen homosexual and feminist contingents, parade spectators were encouraged to join the procession.  Currently, Heritage of Pride requires preregistration of marchers, and sets up barricades along the entire route discouraging the practice. 

Although estimating crowd size is an imprecise science, the NYC March is consistently considered the largest Pride parade in the U.S., with 2.1 million people in 2015, and 2.5 million in 2016. In 2018, attendance was estimated around two million. In 2019, as part of Stonewall 50 – WorldPride NYC, up to five million people took part over the final weekend of the celebrations, with an estimated four million in attendance at the parade. The twelve-hour parade included 150,000 pre-registered participants among 695 groups. It was the largest parade of any kind in the city's history and four times as large as the annual Times Square Ball on New Year's Eve.

Grand marshals

2022

Dominique Morgan, Award winning artist and CEO of The Okra Project, TS Madison, artist, activist and TV/Movie Star, Chase Strangio, ACLU National, Punky Johnson, comedian and Saturday Night Live member and Schuyler Byler, Social Media influencer, Trans Activist

2019 
 Mj Rodriguez, Indya Moore, and Dominique Jackson from the cast of Pose; Phyll Opoku-Gyimah; Monica Helms, creator of the transgender pride flag; The Trevor Project; the Gay Liberation Front

2018
 Billie Jean King, Lambda Legal, Tyler Ford, and Kenita Placide

2017
 American Civil Liberties Union; Brooke Guinan, the first openly transgender firefighter for FDNY; Krishna Stone, activist with Gay Men's Health Crisis; Geng Le, Chinese LGBT rights leader and founder of Blued

2016 
 Jazz Jennings; Subhi Nahas, Syrian refugee who co-founded the first LGBT magazine in Syria; Cecilia Chung

2015
 Ian McKellen
 Derek Jacobi
 Kasha Jacqueline Nabagesera
 J. Christopher Neal – the first openly bisexual Grand Marshal

2014
 Laverne Cox
 Jonathan Groff
 Rea Carey, executive director of the National Gay and Lesbian Task Force

2013
 Edith Windsor, the plaintiff in United States v. Windsor, which resulted in Section 3 of the Defense of Marriage Act being struck down
 Earl Fowlkes
 Harry Belafonte

2012
 Cyndi Lauper
 Chris Salgardo, CEO of Kiel's Since 1851.
 Connie Kopelov & Phyllis Siegel, New York City's first legally married same-sex couple.

2011
 Dan Savage and his husband Terry Miller, It Gets Better Project.
 Rev. Pat Bumgardner of the Metropolitan Community Church of New York.
 Imperial Court of New York LGBT organization.

2010
 Constance McMillen
 Judy Shepard
 Lt. Dan Choi

2009: Stonewall 40
2009 marked the occasion of the 40th Anniversary of the Stonewall Riots in New York City. Accordingly, HOP in conjunction with NYC local government promoted the event for people from around the world to attend.  Grand Marshals that year were:
 Cleve Jones
 Anne Kronenberg
 Dustin Lance Black

2008
 Gilbert Baker
 Candice Cayne
 New York Governor David A. Paterson 
 New York Senator Charles Schumer
 NYC Mayor Mike Bloomberg

See also

 List of LGBT awareness days
 List of LGBT events
 Queens Pride Parade
 Timeline of LGBT history in New York City

References

External links

NYC Pride/Heritage of Pride, Inc.
 Gay and Proud, 1970 documentary film by Lilli Vincenz of the first march in New York City
NYC Gay Pride 2011 photos
NYC Gay Pride 2019 photos

Gay Pride Parade
Fifth Avenue
Pride parades in the United States
LGBT culture in New York City
1970 establishments in New York City
Recurring events established in 1970
1970 in LGBT history